The 2023 WTA Tour (branded as the 2023 Hologic WTA Tour for sponsorship reasons) is the global elite women's professional tennis circuit organized by the Women's Tennis Association (WTA) for the 2023 tennis season. The 2023 WTA Tour calendar comprises the Grand Slam tournaments (supervised by the International Tennis Federation (ITF)), the WTA 1000 tournaments, the WTA 500 tournaments, the WTA 250 tournaments, the Billie Jean King Cup (organized by the ITF), the year-end championships (the WTA Finals and the WTA Elite Trophy), and the team events United Cup (combined event with ATP) and Hopman Cup (sanctioned by the ITF). 2023 appeared to mark the return of the WTA tournaments in China, after strict COVID-19 protocols in the country and the disappearance of former tennis player Peng Shuai. However, the WTA clarified in January 2023 that "a return to the region will require a resolution to the Peng situation", stating that post-US Open tournaments scheduled to be held in China are merely provisional.

Schedule
This is the complete schedule of events on the 2023 calendar.
Key

January

February

March

April

May

June

July

August

September
No schedule yet

October
No schedule yet

November
No schedule yet

Affected tournaments 
The following tournaments were cancelled due to various reasons.

Statistical information
These tables present the number of singles (S), doubles (D), and mixed doubles (X) titles won by each player and each nation during the season, within all the tournament categories of the 2022 WTA Tour: the Grand Slam tournaments, the year-end championships (the WTA Finals), the WTA Premier tournaments (WTA 1000 and WTA 500), and the WTA 250. The players/nations are sorted by:
total number of titles (a doubles title won by two players representing the same nation counts as only one win for the nation);
cumulated importance of those titles (one Grand Slam win equalling two WTA 1000 wins, one year-end championships win equalling one-and-a-half WTA 1000 win, one WTA 1000 win equalling two WTA 500 wins, one WTA 500 win equalling two WTA 250 wins);
a singles > doubles > mixed doubles hierarchy;
alphabetical order (by family names for players).

Key

Titles won by player

Titles won by nation

Titles information
The following players won their first main circuit title in singles, doubles, or mixed doubles:
Singles

 Zhu Lin – Hua Hin (draw)
 Alycia Parks – Lyon (draw)
 Marta Kostyuk – Austin (draw)

Doubles

 Cristina Bucșa – Lyon (draw)
 Wu Fang-hsien – Hua Hin (draw)
 Liudmila Samsonova – Dubai (draw)
 Diane Parry – Mérida (draw)
 Yuliana Lizarazo – Monterrey (draw)
 María Paulina Pérez García – Monterrey (draw)

Mixed

 Luisa Stefani – Australian Open (draw)

The following players defended a main circuit title in singles, doubles, or mixed doubles:
 Singles

 Iga Świątek – Doha (draw)

 Doubles

 Barbora Krejčíková – Australian Open (draw)
 Kateřina Siniaková – Australian Open (draw)
 Natela Dzalamidze – Linz (draw)
 Coco Gauff – Doha (draw)
 Jessica Pegula – Doha (draw)
 Veronika Kudermetova – Dubai (draw)

Best ranking
The following players achieved their career high ranking in this season inside top 50 (players who made their top 10 debut indicated in bold):

 Singles 

 Wang Xiyu (reached place No. 49 on January 9)
 Lucia Bronzetti (reached place No. 50 on January 9)
 Martina Trevisan (reached place No. 21 on January 16)
 Zhang Shuai (reached place No. 22 on January 16)
 Elisabetta Cocciaretto (reached place No. 48 on January 16)
 Linda Nosková (reached place No. 50 on February 6)
 Beatriz Haddad Maia (reached place No. 12 on February 13)
 Ekaterina Alexandrova (reached place No. 16 on February 20)
 Liudmila Samsonova (reached place No. 12 on February 27)
 Alycia Parks (reached place No. 50 on February 27)
 Zhu Lin (reached place No. 33 on March 6)
 Elena Rybakina (reached place No. 7 on March 20)
 Magda Linette (reached place No. 19 on March 20)
 Zheng Qinwen (reached place No. 23 on March 20)
 Anastasia Potapova (reached place No. 26 on March 20)
 Anhelina Kalinina (reached place No. 28 on March 20)
 Bernarda Pera (reached place No. 38 on March 20)
 Marta Kostyuk (reached place No. 39 on March 20)

 Doubles  

 Anna Danilina (reached place No. 10 on January 9)
 Beatriz Haddad Maia (reached place No. 12 on January 9)
 Asia Muhammad (reached place No. 26 on January 9)
 Tamara Zidanšek (reached place No. 47 on January 16)
 Yang Zhaoxuan (reached place No. 9 on January 30)
 Marta Kostyuk (reached place No. 31 on January 30)
 Elena-Gabriela Ruse (reached place No. 40 on January 30)
 Tereza Mihalíková (reached place No. 42 on January 30)
 Anna Bondár (reached place No. 43 on January 30)
 Yana Sizikova (reached place No. 44 on January 30)
 Miriam Kolodziejová (reached place No. 48 on January 30)
 Anna Kalinskaya (reached place No. 49 on February 6)
 Kimberley Zimmermann (reached place No. 37 on March 6)
 Lyudmyla Kichenok (reached place No. 7 on March 20)
 Taylor Townsend (reached place No. 19 on March 20)
 Laura Siegemund (reached place No. 22 on March 20)
 Aldila Sutjiadi (reached place No. 30 on March 20)
 Alycia Parks (reached place No. 42 on March 20)

WTA rankings

Below are the tables for the yearly WTA Race rankings and the WTA rankings of the top 20 singles players, doubles players, and doubles teams.

Singles

No. 1 ranking

Doubles

No. 1 ranking

Points distribution

S = singles players, D = doubles teams, Q = qualification players.
* Assumes undefeated Round Robin match record.

Prize money leaders

Retirements
 Sania Mirza (born 15 November 1986 in Mumbai, Maharashtra, India) she announced her retirement on 7 January after the Dubai Tennis Championships in February.
 Samantha Stosur (born 30 March 1984 in Gold Coast, Queensland, Australia) announced on 14 January on her Instagram that the 2023 Australian Open will be the last tournament of her career.

Comebacks
 Margarita Betova

See also

2023 ATP Tour
2023 WTA 125 tournaments
2023 ITF Women's World Tennis Tour
International Tennis Federation

Notes

References

External links
Women's Tennis Association (WTA) official website
International Tennis Federation (ITF) official website
Billie Jean King Cup (BJK Cup) official website

2023 WTA Tour
WTA Tour seasons
WTA Tour
WTA Tour